KBFL (1060 AM) is a radio station broadcasting a sports format. The station most recently and throughout most of its history had a Music of Your Life adult standards format; from September 1, 2013 through March 2, 2015, KBFL broadcast a smooth jazz format. KBFL simulcasts on KBFL-FM 99.9 and translator K245CA 96.9 FM. The station is licensed to Springfield, Missouri and was previously owned by Meyer-Baldridge, Inc. (d/b/a Meyer Communications).

On July 24, 2020, it was announced that the sports talk format on KBFL’s sister station KWTO-FM (now KTXR) would be moving to the KBFL frequencies, and that the entire group of Meyer Communications owned radio stations were being purchased by Zimmer Midwest Communications. KBFL began simulcasting KWTO-FM on July 30, and unveiled a new logo reflecting the new frequencies "JOCK 96.9 FM 99.9 FM 1060 AM.". ESPN on air promos branded the station as “ESPN the JOCK”.

As of August 7, 2020, "ESPN the JOCK" fully transitioned to KBFL and KBFL-FM and its 96.9 FM translator. 98.7 FM began broadcasting a soft rock format on August 11.

Previous logo

References

External links
KBFL's website
KBFL's labor department problems. AP: April 2, 1995. Retrieved December 9, 2015.

BFL (AM)
Sports radio stations in the United States
ESPN Radio stations